Luzhou District may refer to:

Luzhou District, Changzhi, in Shanxi, PR China
Luzhou District, New Taipei, in Taiwan

District name disambiguation pages